Fifth Estate (FE) is a U.S. periodical, based in Detroit, Michigan, begun in 1965, and presently with staff members across North America who connect via the Internet. Its editorial collective sometimes has divergent views on the topics the magazine addresses but generally shares an anarchist, anti-authoritarian outlook and a non-dogmatic, action-oriented approach to change. The title implies that the periodical is an alternative to the fourth estate (traditional print journalism).

Fifth Estate is frequently cited as the longest running English language anarchist publication in North America, although this is sometimes disputed since it became only explicitly anti-authoritarian in 1975 after ten years of publishing as part of the 1960s underground press movement. The archives for the Fifth Estate are held at the Labadie Collection in Ann Arbor, Michigan.

History

Origin 
Fifth Estate was started by Harvey Ovshinsky, a seventeen-year-old youth from Detroit. He was inspired by a 1965 summer trip to California where he worked on the Los Angeles Free Press, the first underground paper in the United States; Harvey's father, inventor Stan Ovshinsky, knew the editor of the Free Press, Art Kunkin, from their years as comrades in the Socialist Party. The name "Fifth Estate" was inspired by The Fifth Estate coffee house on the Sunset Strip, where the Free Press had its office in the basement.

The first issue was published on November 19, 1965 — "That's what we really are — the voice of the liberal element in Detroit", it said. It was produced on a typewriter and then reproduced by offset lithograph, in an 8-page tabloid newspaper format with two pages left blank. It featured a critical review of a Bob Dylan concert, a borrowed Jules Feiffer cartoon, alternative events listing, and an announcement of a forthcoming anti-Vietnam War march. None of these things would have been included in contemporary newspapers.

In 1966 Ovshinsky moved the office from his parents' basement to a Cass Corridor storefront near Wayne State University. Here the paper was saved from extinction by the Detroit Committee to End the War in Vietnam, John Sinclair's Artist Workshop, and other radicals, with Sinclair signing on as the paper's first music editor. Later in 1966 the paper moved to Plum Street where they also established a bookshop. Fifth Estate thrived in the late sixties, a period when over 500 underground papers emerged in the US. Thousands of copies were distributed locally with hundreds more being sent to GIs in Vietnam. Fifth Estate openly called on soldiers to mutiny. In 1967 the Fifth Estate offices were tear-gassed by the National Guard during the 12th Street riot. In this period the print run reached  15,000 – 20,000 copies, publishing biweekly in a tabloid newspaper format of 20 to 32 pages, with local ads and listings.

The spirit of the paper during the first ten years of its existence was summed up in a Feb. 1, 1969, staff editorial:

1970s
By 1972 the optimism of the sixties had worn off and the tone of the paper became more concerned with struggle than fun. Ovshinsky had left in 1969, leaving a group of young people (teenagers or people in their early twenties) to run the paper. Peter Werbe, a 29-year-old Michigan State University dropout who had been with the paper since March 1966, took over as editor. The staff sent delegations to Vietnam, Cambodia and Cuba. The massive defeat of George McGovern and the election of Richard Nixon for a second term with an increased vote damaged the movement — many underground papers ceased publication and alternative news agencies such as the Liberation News Service, and the Underground Press Syndicate were beginning to collapse. The Fifth Estate was mentioned in the national press when one of its reporters, Pat Halley, threw a shaving cream pie at Guru Maharaj Ji in 1973. Though the guru forgave him publicly, two of his followers attacked Halley a week later and fractured his skull.

1980s and 1990s
By 1980, the paper had become more anti-technological and anti-civilisation, something for which it was well known throughout the 1980s. It was the focal point for the development of the political trend of anarcho-primitivism. Long-time contributor John Zerzan published his seminal essays on time, language, art, number and agriculture in the magazine. His articles were frequently accompanied by long critiques by George Bradford (né David Watson) or Bob Brubaker, who developed different versions of primitivism. After Zerzan's 1988 article on agriculture, he started publishing his new essays in Anarchy: A Journal of Desire Armed. Dismayed by what he saw as the excesses of Zerzan and others, Watson eventually repudiated primitivism in his 1997 essay "Swamp Fever". However, as of 2012, Zerzan began publishing articles in the Fifth Estate again on subjects as varied as the Black Bloc, the sea, and the Luddites.

2001 to present
In 2002, the center of the magazine shifted from Detroit, Michigan to Liberty, Tennessee when long-time contributor Andrew Smith (who wrote under the name Andy Sunfrog) took over the main editorial duties of the magazine, although long-time Detroit staffers like Peter Werbe remained involved.

In 2006, Fifth Estate decentralized their editorial group, and since then issues have been published that were primarily produced in Michigan, Tennessee, New York and Wisconsin. The current editorial collective has moved away from primitivism, does not endorse a specific political line and welcomes voices from disparate strains of anti-authoritarian thought. The group also continues to endorse anarchism as a specific ideology, but embraces a more inclusive, yet still radical, anti-capitalist perspective. Continuing to cover environmental and anti-capitalist resistance, articles have also appeared which address immigration, race, feminism, queer sexuality and transgender issues.

Smith left the paper in 2009 to pursue an academic career at a Tennessee university, but still contributes an occasional article. The magazine shifted back to Detroit for final editing and production with Peter and Marilyn Werbe having responsibility for much of that plus the magazine's business functions. The collective now consists of the Werbes and several others throughout North America.

In 2008, long-time contributor Marius Mason was arrested as part of what some call the Green Scare. In February 2009, he was sentenced to almost 22 years for two acts of environmentally motivated property destruction. The Fifth Estate has run articles protesting both the labeling of his actions as "terrorism" as well as the long sentence he received.

Contributors
David Watson, longtime Fifth Estate writer and editorial collective member
Fredy Perlman, Fifth Estate writer
John Zerzan, Fifth Estate contributor from 1974 to 1988; 2012 to present
Richard Mock, designer of many of the linocuts used on Fifth Estate's covers.
Marius Mason Anarchist environmental prisoner. Serving 22 years in prison for nonviolent ecological sabotage.
Peter Werbe Editorial collective member currently. Associated with the publication since 1966.

See also
 List of underground newspapers of the 1960s counterculture

References

Further reading

External links
Official website
Fifth Estate Issue 368-369, Spring-Summer, 2005, includes several articles relating to the publication's history
Metro Times story on ''Fifth Estate'''s 40th anniversary
Labadie Collection Finding Aid for Fifth Estate

Anarchist periodicals published in the United States
Magazines established in 1965
Post-left anarchism
Anti-consumerist groups
Triannual magazines published in the United States
Magazines published in Detroit
Political magazines published in the United States